Andre Kona N'Gole (born 16 June 1970) is a Congolese football player. He started playing for Jomo Cosmos in South Africa where he was discovered by FIFA agent Marcelo Houseman who made his transfer to play striker for Gençlerbirliği in the Turkish Super League, for 5 seasons.

By scoring 74 goals including 12 penalties for Gençlerbirliği, he became the all-time top scorer of the club, a record that had previously stood since 1958. Between 1993 (23 August 1993) and 2001 (26 May 2001), he played 147 matches totalling 12,458 minutes for the club.

He has scored a total of 97 goals in 265 games in the Turkish Super League.

Has duel Turkish citizenship, having gained naturalisation during his career in Turkey.

Kona N'Gole played for the Zaire national football team at the 1992 and 1996 African Cup of Nations finals.

Honours 
 Gençlerbirliği
Turkish Cup (1): 2001

References

External links
 Profile at TFF.org

1970 births
Living people
People from Lubumbashi
Democratic Republic of the Congo footballers
Democratic Republic of the Congo international footballers
1992 African Cup of Nations players
1996 African Cup of Nations players
Democratic Republic of the Congo expatriate footballers
Democratic Republic of the Congo expatriate sportspeople in South Africa
Expatriate soccer players in South Africa
Expatriate footballers in Turkey
Democratic Republic of the Congo expatriate sportspeople in Turkey
Gençlerbirliği S.K. footballers
Antalyaspor footballers
Diyarbakırspor footballers
İstanbulspor footballers
Jomo Cosmos F.C. players
Süper Lig players
Association football forwards
21st-century Democratic Republic of the Congo people